The Bhimgoda Barrage, also referred to as the Bhimgoda Weir or Bhimgoda Head Works, is a barrage on the Ganges River at Har ki Pauri near Haridwar in Haridwar district, Uttarakhand, India. Built as the headworks of the Upper Ganges Canal, an initial barrage was completed by 1854 and replaced twice; the final one completed in 1983. The primary purpose for the barrage is irrigation but it also serves to provide water for hydroelectric power production and control floods. The area behind the barrage is known as the Neel Dhara Bird Sanctuary and is a popular destination for various waterbirds and tourists.

Background

The initial barrage was constructed between 1840 and 1854 to supply the Upper Ganges Canal with water and control flooding. This was done during a significant period of infrastructure development in India. Lord Dalhousie, the Governor-General of India at the time inaugurated the project. A new barrage was constructed downstream between 1979 and 1983 to replace the older barrage upstream. The Pathri and Mohanpur Mohammadpur Power Plants along the canal's length were commissioned in 1955 and 1952, respectively.

Design and operation

Adjacent to it, on the right bank of the river, the barrage diverts water into the Upper Ganges Canal. Although both power plants are owned by Uttaranchal Jal Vidyut Nigam Ltd., canal flows are regulated by the Uttar Pradesh Irrigation Department.

See also

Proby Cautley - engineer of the Ganges Canal

References

Dams completed in 1854
Dams completed in 1983
Dams in Uttarakhand
Tidal barrages
Haridwar district
Ganges
1854 establishments in India
1983 establishments in Uttar Pradesh
20th-century architecture in India